Davison "Dave" Eugene Soper (21 March 1943, Milwaukee, Wisconsin) is an American theoretical physicist specializing in high energy physics.

Education and career
Soper received his bachelor's degree in 1965 from Amherst College  and his PhD in 1971 under James Bjorken from Stanford University, where he worked with John Kogut. Soper was from 1971 to 1973 an instructor and from 1973 to 1977 an assistant professor at Princeton University. He was appointed in 1977–80 an assistant professor, in 1980–83 an associate professor, and from 1983 to the present a professor at the University of Oregon, where from 2004 to 2007 he was chair of the physics department.

His doctoral dissertation on Null Plane Field Theory dealt with the theory of high energy scattering processes in the parton model. With George Sterman and John C. Collins, he proved a factorization theorem in perturbative quantum chromodynamics (QCD).

Soper is a member of the "Coordinated Theoretical-Experimental Project on QCD“ (CTEQ), whose co-spokesperson he was from 2001 to 2004. He was on the editorial board of Physical Review Letters and Physical Review D.

Honors 
In 2009 Soper received with R. Keith Ellis and John C. Collins the Sakurai Prize of the American Physical Society.

He became a Fellow of the American Physical Society in 2010. He was cited " For seminal work in Perturbative Quantum Chromodynamics, especially proving theorems on factorization which play a crucial role in interpreting high energy particle collisions."

Selected works
 Classical Field Theory. Dover Publ., Mineola, NY 2008,  (originally published by Wiley, New York 1976).

References

External links
D.E. Soper on InSPIRE database
arXiv.org preprints for D. Soper
search on author Davison Soper from Google Scholar
Online notes from a two quarter course in quantum field theory taught by D. E. Soper

1943 births
Living people
Scientists from Milwaukee
21st-century American physicists
Theoretical physicists
Fellows of the American Association for the Advancement of Science
Fellows of the American Physical Society
J. J. Sakurai Prize for Theoretical Particle Physics recipients
Amherst College alumni
Stanford University alumni
University of Oregon faculty